Armeria alpina is a flowering plant in the family Plumbaginaceae.

Description
Leaves are simple and mostly hairless. They form dense basal rosettes of about 25 leaves. The flowers are small, with five pink petals. They bloom from July to August.

Distribution
Armeria alpina is native to France, Italy, Austria and the Balkan Peninsula.

Habitat
And Spain, in Los Pirineos

References

Biolib
USDA
Hortipedia

alpina
Flora of the Alps
Flora of the Pyrenees
Flora of the Carpathians